April Baker-Bell is an American academic and the author of Linguistic Justice: Black Language, Literacy, Identity, and Pedagogy. She is the 2020 recipient of the Orwell Award from the National Council of Teachers of English.

She is a native of Detroit, Michigan, and is an associate professor in the English department of Michigan State University.

References

External links

Living people
Year of birth missing (living people)
American non-fiction writers
People from Detroit
Michigan State University faculty